The Making of a Southern Democracy: North Carolina Politics from Kerr Scott to Pat McCrory is a 2014 non-fiction book by Tom Eamon, published by University of North Carolina Press.

It documents the political developments between World War II and the time the book was published.

Background
The author works at East Carolina University and has the rank associate professor.

Reception
Patrick Andelic of the University of Oxford stated that the book is "a thorough and well-documented survey" even though it makes no thesis statement. Andelic argued that, compared to the elections documented in this book, the film The Campaign, which is a fictional account of North Carolina politics, was "ultimately a good deal less interesting".

Bryan Thrift of Johnston Community College stated that the author "succeeds masterfully" at the stated goal. Thrift praised the "thorough" researching, and stated that the "primary strength" is how the work analyzes the political developments of the state, though Thrift argues that the book also has "vivid, engaging stories".

See also
 Politics of North Carolina
 Kerr Scott
 Pat McCrory

References

Notes

Further reading

External links
 The Making of a Southern Democracy - University of North Carolina Press
2014 books
Books about North Carolina
University of North Carolina Press books
Books about politics of the United States